The Rural Municipality of Douglas No. 436 is a rural municipality (RM) in the Canadian province of Saskatchewan within Census Division No. 16 and  Division No. 6.

History 
The RM of Douglas No. 436 incorporated as a rural municipality on December 13, 1909.

Geography

Communities and localities 
The following urban municipalities are surrounded by the RM.

Villages
 Speers
 Richard

The following unincorporated communities are within the RM.

Localities
 Alticane
 Keatley
 Lilac

Demographics 

Government 
The RM of Douglas No. 436 is governed by an elected municipal council and an appointed administrator that meets on the second Wednesday of every month. The reeve of the RM is Nick Partyka while its administrator is Charles W. Linnell. The RM's office is located in Speers.

Transportation 
 Saskatchewan Highway 40
 Saskatchewan Highway 376
 Canadian Pacific Railway (abandoned)

See also 
List of rural municipalities in Saskatchewan

References 

D

Division No. 16, Saskatchewan